Georgios Tsakanikas (10 November 1934 – 1 March 2016) was a Greek shot putter and discus thrower. He was named the 1961 Greek Athlete of the Year.

Tsakanikas  won a gold medal in the 1959 Mediterranean Games  and a bronze medal in the 1959 Summer Universiade in shot put. He also represented Greece in the 1956, 1960 and 1964 Summer Olympic Games in shot put and in 1964 in discus throw. Tsakanikas also competed tor Greece in the Balkan Games winning four silver medals in shot put in 1955, 1957, 1959, 1960 and 1961. The "Balkan Games" have become a loose collection of Balkan Championships. Tsakanikas' personal best in shot put is 18.21 m. achieved on 26 December 1964 in Athens. He died in Athens, March 1, 2016.

References

1934 births
2016 deaths
Greek male shot putters
Greek male discus throwers
Athletes (track and field) at the 1956 Summer Olympics
Athletes (track and field) at the 1960 Summer Olympics
Athletes (track and field) at the 1964 Summer Olympics
Olympic athletes of Greece
Universiade medalists in athletics (track and field)
Mediterranean Games gold medalists for Greece
Athletes (track and field) at the 1959 Mediterranean Games
Mediterranean Games medalists in athletics
Universiade bronze medalists for Greece
Medalists at the 1959 Summer Universiade
Athletes from Athens
20th-century Greek people